Billy Higgins Quintet is an album by American jazz drummer Billy Higgins recorded in 1993 and released on the Sweet Basil label.

Reception

The AllMusic review by Alex Henderson calls it a " fine album, which is without a dull moment".

Track listing
 "Step Right up to the Bottom" (Harold Land) - 8:12   
 "Seeker" (Oscar Brashear) - 10:54   
 "The Vision" (Cedar Walton) - 11:04   
 "Hot House" (Tadd Dameron) - 7:52   
 "You Must Believe in Spring" (Alan and Marilyn Bergman, Jacques Demy, Michel Legrand) - 10:10   
 "Jackie-ing" (Thelonious Monk) - 9:51   
 "Churn" (Oscar Brashear) - 15:23

Personnel
Billy Higgins - drums
Harold Land - tenor saxophone
Oscar Brashear - trumpet
Cedar Walton - piano
David Williams - bass

References 

Evidence Music albums
Billy Higgins albums
1993 albums